Baptizing is an album by the progressive bluegrass Maryland band The Seldom Scene. It is marked as a last album for John Starling and arrival of new singer/guitarist Phil Rosenthal. It is also The Seldom Scene's last album recorded under Rebel Records, before switching to Sugar Hill Records
.

Track listing 
 "By the Side of the Road" (Albert E. Brumley) – 4:09
 "Brother John" (Phil Rosenthal) – 3:04
 "Dreaming of a Little Cabin" (Albert E. Brumley) – 3:54
 "Fallen Leaves" (Louis M. Jones) – 3:22
 "He Took Your Place" (Lester Flatt, Earl Scruggs) – 2:46
 "Take Him In" (Phil Rosenthal) – 2:13
 "Hobo on a Freight Train to Heaven" (Sam Weedman) – 2:39
 "Will You Be Ready to Go Home?" (Hank Williams) – 2:34
 "Were You There?" (Traditional; arranged by John Duffey) – 3:25
 "Walk With Him Again" (Phil Rosenthal) – 2:49
 "Gospel Medley" (Traditional; arranged by John Duffey) – 4:09

Personnel 
The Seldom Scene
 John Starling - vocals, guitar
 Phil Rosenthal - vocals, guitar
 John Duffey - mandolin, vocals
 Ben Eldridge - banjo, guitar, vocals
 Mike Auldridge - Dobro, guitar, vocals
 Tom Gray - electric bass, vocals
with:
 Ricky Skaggs - violin

References

External links 
 Official site

1978 albums
The Seldom Scene albums
Rebel Records albums